The Bombay Catholic Sabha (BCS) was founded on January 20, 1989 under the patronage of the then Archbishop of Bombay, Cardinal Simon Pimenta. It is a non-political organisation registered as a Public Trust, under the Bombay Public Trusts Act 1950. The BCS is a recognised lay association of the Archdiocese of Bombay, affiliated to the All India Catholic Union (AICU) that is in turn recognised by the Catholic Bishops' Conference of India.

As a part of the Youth Activities thrust area of the Sabha it offers employment to youth through RACE- Resource And Career Enhancement  RACE conducts Career Guidance workshops in parishes.

References

Catholic Church in India
Catholic organizations established in the 20th century